William Copeland Wood Murdoch (3 October 1914, Old Kilpatrick – October 1987, Helensburgh) was a Scottish international rugby union player who played at full-back.

Rugby Union career

Amateur career

Murdoch played for Hillhead HSFP

Provincial career

Murdoch played for Glasgow District

International career

He was capped a total of nine times, but there was an extremely long hiatus in his career due to the Second World War – he gained his first cap in 1935, and his last in 1948. He gained four caps in the 1947–48 season. This gives him one of the longest international careers on record. Only he and W.B. Young were capped on either side of the War.

Referee career

In later life, he became a referee.

References

Sources

 Bath, Richard (ed.) The Scotland Rugby Miscellany (Vision Sports Publishing Ltd, 2007 )
 Cotton, Fran (Ed.) (1984) The Book of Rugby Disasters & Bizarre Records. Compiled by Chris Rhys. London. Century Publishing. 
 Jones, J.R. Encyclopedia of Rugby Union Football (Robert Hale, London, 1976 )
 Massie, Allan A Portrait of Scottish Rugby (Polygon, Edinburgh)

1910s births
1987 deaths
Scottish rugby union players
Scottish rugby union referees
Scotland international rugby union players
Hillhead RFC players
Scottish Inter-District Championship referees
Glasgow District (rugby union) players
Rugby union players from West Dunbartonshire